Ruth Berman is an American writer of weird science fiction and speculative poetry. In 2003, she won the Rhysling Award for Best Short Poem. She was also the winner of the 2006 Dwarf Stars Award for her poem Knowledge Of. In 1973, she was a finalist for the first John W. Campbell Award for Best New Writer.

Her short fiction has appeared in Analog, New Worlds, Star Trek: The New Voyages, Shadows 2, Tales of the Unanticipated, and Asimov's Science Fiction. Berman is a staff member of the University of Minnesota.

Bibliography

Poetry

Anthologies

List of poems

Fiction

References

External links
Ruth Berman Page

Living people
20th-century American poets
20th-century American women writers
21st-century American novelists
21st-century American poets
21st-century American women writers
American science fiction writers
American women novelists
American women poets
American women short story writers
Star Trek fiction writers
Star Trek fanfiction writers
Asimov's Science Fiction people
Rhysling Award for Best Short Poem winners
Women science fiction and fantasy writers
20th-century American short story writers
21st-century American short story writers
Year of birth missing (living people)